Algie Thomas Howell, Jr. (born January 8, 1938) is an American politician. From 2004 to 2014 he was a member of the Virginia House of Delegates representing the 90th district, made up of parts of the cities of Norfolk and Virginia Beach. He is a member of the Democratic Party.

Howell has served on the House committees on Appropriations (2006–), Counties, Cities and Towns (2010–2012), General Laws (2004–2005), Health, Welfare and Institutions (2004–), Privileges and Elections (2010–), Rules (2013–), and Science and Technology (2004–2009).

Electoral history
Howell first ran for the House of Delegates in 2003, when 90th district Republican Delegate Winsome Sears announced she would not seek a second term. Howell won the Democratic nomination in a May 31, 2003 caucus against 20-year House veteran William P. "Billy" Robinson, Jr., who had lost the seat to Sears in 2001. He was unopposed in the November 2003 general election.

Notes

External links
 (campaign finance)

1938 births
Living people
Democratic Party members of the Virginia House of Delegates
Norfolk State University alumni
Hampton University alumni
Politicians from Norfolk, Virginia
21st-century American politicians